WAKX (98.7 FM, "KIX Country 98.7") is a radio station licensed to serve the community of Palm Coast, Florida. The station is owned by Flagler County Broadcasting and the broadcast license is held by Flagler Broadcasting, LLC. WAKX shares radio studios in Bunnell, Florida, with sister stations WBHQ (92.7 FM) and WNZF (1550 AM).

History

Kix Country 98.7
Ashley Thomas Joyner received the original construction permit for this station from the Federal Communications Commission on December 9, 2009. The new station was assigned the WPLC call sign by the FCC on December 16, 2009. On December 16, 2009, license holder Ashley Thomas Joyner applied to the FCC to transfer the permit to a single shareholder corporation named Joyner Radio, Inc. The move was approved by the FCC on December 29, 2009, and the transaction was consummated on January 4, 2010.

In April 2012, Joyner Radio, Inc., reached an agreement to sell the still-under-construction station to Flagler County Broadcasting for $301,000. The deal was approved by the FCC on May 21, 2012, and the transaction was consummated on May 23, 2012. The station's call sign was changed to WAKX on June 19, 2012.

On August 1, 2012 at midnight, officially launched with a country music format branded as "Kix Country 98.7".

References

External links
WAKX official website

AKX
Country radio stations in the United States
Palm Coast, Florida
Radio stations established in 2012
2012 establishments in Florida